Osredek pri Krmelju is a settlement northwest of Krmelj in the Municipality of Sevnica in central Slovenia. The area is part of the historical region of Lower Carniola. The municipality is now included in the Lower Sava Statistical Region. It includes the hamlets of Rupa, Radvanca, Dobovec, Gabrje, Komatca, Oplaz, Kij, and Prinštal.

Name
The name of the settlement was changed from Osredek to Osredek pri Krmelju in 1953. The hamlet of Prinštal was also known as Primštal in older sources.

Church

The local church is dedicated to Saints Primus and Felician and belongs to the Parish of Šentjanž. It dates to the 17th century.

References

External links
Osredek pri Krmelju at Geopedia

Populated places in the Municipality of Sevnica